La verdad is a Spanish domestic noir television series created by César Benítez and Aitor Gabilondo that originally aired on Telecinco from 21 May to 26 December 2018. The cast, led by Elena Rivera, also features Lydia Bosch, Jon Kortajarena, José Luis García Pérez, Ginés García Millán and Irene Montalà, among others.

Premise 
The fiction is primarily set in Cantabria. 8 years after the disappearance of a girl (Paula), a teenager claiming to be her comes into action. The family welcomes her. But suspicions about the true identity behind the 17-year-old woman do not end there as her narrative is not exactly credible and she may be an imposter.

Cast

Production 

Created by César Benítez and Aitor Gabilondo, the series was produced by Plano a Plano for Mediaset España. Norberto López Amado, Jorge Dorado, Fernando Bassi, José Ramos Paíno and Pablo Tobías assumed the direction of the episodes.

The series was shot on location in Cantabria, in places such as Santander, Laredo, the cliff of El Bolao and Ruiloba. Additional footage was also shot in Madrid. Filming started in December 2015 and wrapped in November 2016.

Release 
Consisting of 16 episodes, the series premiered on Telecinco on 21 May 2018. Cut by a hiatus from July to November, the broadcasting run ended on 26 December 2018. Overall the series averaged "unimpressive" viewership ratings (1,852 million viewers and a 12.8% audience share).

Awards and nominations 

|-
| align = "center" rowspan = "2" | 2018 || 20th Iris Awards || Best Actor || Ginés García Millán ||  || 
|-
| 6th  || Best Drama Actress || Elena Rivera ||  || align = "center" | 
|}

References 

2010s Spanish drama television series
Spanish-language television shows
2018 Spanish television series debuts
2018 Spanish television series endings
Television shows filmed in Spain
Television shows set in Spain
Telecinco network series
Television series by Plano a Plano